National Secondary Route 233, or just Route 233 (or ) is a National Road Route of Costa Rica, located in the Cartago province.

Description
In Cartago province the route covers Cartago canton (Oriental district), Oreamuno canton (San Rafael district).

References

Highways in Costa Rica